Live at the Pan-African Festival is a live recording of Archie Shepp's performance in Algiers on July 29–30, 1969, when his free jazz group was complemented by several North African musicians.

Track listing 
All songs arranged by Shepp.
 "Brotherhood at Ketchaoua" (Archie Shepp) – 15:55
 "We Have Come Back" (Ted Joans, Archie Shepp) – 31:19

Personnel 
 Archie Shepp – tenor saxophone
 Clifford Thornton – cornet
 Grachan Moncur III – trombone
 Dave Burrell – piano
 Alan Silva – bass
 Sunny Murray – drums
 Ted Joans – poet
 Don Lee – poet 
 Algerian and Tuareg musicians – shawms and percussions

1971 live albums
Archie Shepp live albums
BYG Actuel live albums
Live free jazz albums
African festivals